Venice Elphi anak Danny Kaya (born 10 September 1984) is a Malaysian footballer plays for Angkatan Tentera Malaysia in Malaysia M3 League. Venice plays as a winger. As of 2022, he is the longest serving player in the current ATM FA squad.

Career

ATM FA
Venice football career started when his talent was spotted in 2007, two years after he joined the Malaysian Armed Forces in 2005. He was selected in the armed forces football team starting in 2008, when ATM FA was in the second-tier Malaysia Premier League. Venice turned full-time professional with ATM FA in 2011, having played before that as a semi-professional player, combining soccer with his army duties.

Venice has won the 2012 Malaysia Premier League with ATM FA, and were in the team that finished runners-up to Kelantan FA in the 2012 Malaysia Cup final, the first time ATM FA qualified for the Malaysia Cup final since 1966.

International career
Venice received his first call-up to the Malaysia national football team in early 2012 under K. Rajagopal.

Personal
Venice was a Corporal in the Malaysian Armed Forces, before being promoted to Sergeant in 2012. He is of Iban-Bidayuh native. On 30 April 2018, he were promoted to Staff Sergeant.

Venice tragically lost his first daughter, 6, on July 2018 in an accidental fall from the family's apartment.

References

External links

1984 births
Living people
People from Kuching
People from Sarawak
Malaysian footballers
Malaysia international footballers
Iban people
Bidayuh people
ATM FA players
Malaysia Super League players
Association football wingers